Bodil Lindqvist v Åklagarkammaren i Jönköping (2003) is a decision by the Court of Justice of the European Communities (European Court of Justice). It held that referring to various persons on an internet page and identifying them either by name or by other means constitutes processing of personal data by automatic means within the meaning of Community law.

It was the first time the Court ruled on the scope of Directive 95/46/EC (Data Protection Directive) and freedom of movement for such data on the internet. It was cited in Costeja (2014), a controversial ruling that held an internet search engine operator established in the European Union (EU) is responsible for the processing that it carries out of personal information that appears on web pages published by third parties, confirming a right of erasure widely regarded as a so-called right to be forgotten.

See also
 Google Spain SL, Google Inc. v Agencia Española de Protección de Datos, Mario Costeja González (Costeja)

Notes

Bibliography

Court of Justice of the European Union case law
2003 in case law
2003 in the European Union
Privacy case law